Roman Podolyak (born 21 April 1993 in Ukraine) is a professional Ukrainian football defender who currently plays for FC Skala Stryi in the Ukrainian First League.

Podolyak is the product of the UFK Lviv School System. He made his debut for FC Bukovyna played a full-time game against FC Olimpik Donetsk on 29 March 2014 in the Ukrainian First League.

References

External links
Statistics at FFU website (Ukr)

1993 births
Living people
Ukrainian footballers
FC Karpaty-2 Lviv players
FC Bukovyna Chernivtsi players
FC Skala Stryi (2004) players
Association football defenders
Ukrainian First League players
Ukrainian Second League players